is a mobile terrestrial digital audio/video and data broadcasting service in Japan, Argentina, Brazil, Chile, Uruguay, Paraguay, Peru and the Philippines. Service began experimentally during 2005 and commercially on April 1, 2006. It is designed as a component of ISDB-T, the terrestrial digital broadcast system used in those countries, as each channel is divided into 13 segments, with a further segment separating it from the next channel; an HDTV broadcast signal occupies 12 segments, leaving the remaining (13th) segment for mobile receivers, hence the name, "1seg" or "One Seg".

Its use in Brazil was established in late 2007 (starting in just a few cities), with a slight difference from the Japanese counterpart: it is broadcast under a 30 frame/s transmission setting (Japanese broadcasts are under the 15 frame/s transmission setting).

Technical information 

The ISDB-T system uses the UHF band at frequencies between 470 and 770 MHz (806 MHz in Brazil), giving a total bandwidth 300 MHz. The bandwidth is divided into fifty name channels 13 through 62. Each channel is 6 MHz wide consisting of a 5.57 MHz wide signalling band and a 430 kHz guard band to limit cross channel interference. Each of these channels is further divided into 13 segments, each with 428 kHz of bandwidth. 1 seg uses a single of these segments to carry the 1seg transport stream.

1seg, like ISDB-T uses QPSK for modulation, with 2/3 forward error correction and 1/4 guard ratio. The total datarate is 416 kbit/s.

The television system uses an H.264/MPEG-4 AVC video stream and an HE-AAC audio stream multiplexed into an MPEG transport stream. The maximum video resolution is 320x240 pixels, with a video bitrate of between 220 and 320 kbit/s. Audio conforms to HE-AAC profile, with a bitrate of 48 to 64 kbit/s. Additional data (EPG, interactive services, etc.) is transmitted using BML and occupies the remaining 10 to 100 kbit/s of bandwidth.

Conditional access and copy control are implemented in 1seg broadcasting by the use of Broadcast Flag-like structure contained in the "Copy Control Descriptor" within the broadcast. The broadcast contents themselves are not encrypted, but  the Copy Control information forces the device to encrypt stored recordings and disallows making a copy of the recording.

Broadcast Markup Language
Broadcast Markup Language (BML), is a data-transmission service allowing text to be displayed on a 1seg TV screen.

The text contains news, sports, weather forecasts, emergency warnings such as Earthquake Early Warning, etc. free of charge. Further information can be found through links to content on websites, frequently those belonging to the television station itself.

EPG (program guides) is not included, but transmitted in separate stream (EIT).

Multiple-program arrangement 
On June 23, 2008, broadcaster Tokyo MX officially began using  technology to simultaneously broadcast two programs on a single divided segment. Most 1seg receivers manufactured after September 2008 are compatible with this technology.

Popularity 
Until the end of March 2008, Japanese regulation required that the programs on 1seg were fundamentally the same as those broadcast on the equivalent HDTV channel. On April 1 the regulation was revised, and experimental programs by 1seg or third parties have begun airing on several stations.

On January 16, 2008, JEITA released their monthly shipping survey showing approx. 4.806 million mobile phones were sold in Japan in November 2007. Of these, approx. 3.054 million phones, 63.5% of the total, can receive 1seg broadcasts.

In the fiscal year of 2007, on average 45% of mobile phones had 1seg reception capability out of the 22.284 million units sold. The percent increased from 26.8% in April 2007 to 64.2% at end of fiscal year March 2008.

Receivers

Electronic dictionary
  Sharp Papyrus PW-TC900
  Sharp Papyrus PW-TC920
  Sharp Papyrus PW-TC930
  Sharp Papyrus PW-TC980
PC connect type
  Pixela PC
  Monster TV 1D PC card Type II 1seg receiver by SKNET
  Cowon D2TV
 and more.
Car navigation system
  Sanyo One-seg & car navigation system
 and more.
Handheld game console
  1seg PSP-2000 Tuner
  Nintendo DS (via an add-on called "DS Terebi")
Portable devices
Set top box
Others
  Sony Walkman NW-A919
  Kodak 3-inch OLED TV
 and more.
Mobile Phones
The first mobile phone handsets able to support 1seg were sold by au by KDDI to consumers in autumn 2005.

See also 
 Digital terrestrial television
 DMB - South Korea
 DVB-H
 ISDB-T
 ISDB-T International

References

External links 

 ISDB-T, Application, Present and Future, PDF File
  1seg official site (Japanese)
 ACCESS Ginga Edition for 1Seg in Brazil
GPS fitted with ISDB-T OneSeg sales grow in Brazil

ISDB
Broadcast engineering
Digital television
Mobile telephone broadcasting
Mobile television
Television transmission standards